is a Japanese long-distance runner. She competed in the marathon at the 2012 Summer Olympics, placing 78th with a time of 2:40:06.  She finished in 14th place in the marathon at the 2015 World Championship with a time of 2:32:37.  Her personal best is 2:23:23, set in Osaka in 2012, while she was winning the 2012 Osaka marathon.  She won the Osaka Marathon again in 2017, in a time of 2:24:22.  Winning the Osaka Marathon earned her a place on Japan's 2017 World Championship team.

References

1987 births
Living people
Japanese female long-distance runners
Olympic athletes of Japan
Olympic female marathon runners
Athletes (track and field) at the 2012 Summer Olympics
People from Okayama Prefecture
World Athletics Championships athletes for Japan
Japanese female marathon runners
20th-century Japanese women
21st-century Japanese women